Opinion polling on Hong Kong identity has been regularly conducted by Hong Kong pollsters on how Hong Kong citizens identify themselves as - mainly as Hongkongers, as Chinese nationals, or both.

HKPORI polling 
The opinion polls in this section were conducted by Hong Kong Public Opinion Research Institute (HKPORI) and its predecessor Public Opinion Programme, the University of Hong Kong (HKUPOP). The question asked is: "You would identify yourself as 'Hongkonger', 'Hongkonger in China', 'Chinese in Hong Kong' or 'Chinese'?" ("你會稱自己為 香港人/中國人/香港的中國人/中國的香港人")

The "Hongkonger (total)" and "Chinese (total)" in the graph and table below refer to the sum of, respectively, 'Hongkonger' (香港人) and 'Hongkonger in China' (中國的香港人), and 'Chinese' (中國人) and 'Chinese in Hong Kong' (香港的中國人). The "Others" include "Other" (其他) and "don't know"/"hard to say" (唔知/難講).

Graphical summary

Statistical table

CCPOS polling 
The opinion polls in this section were conducted Centre for Communication and Public Opinion Survey (CCPOS). The question asked is: "What kind of people you think you are?" The options were 'Hongkonger' (香港人), 'Hongkonger but also Chinese' (係香港人，但都係中國人), 'Chinese but also Hongkonger' (係中國人，但都係香港人), or 'Chinese' (中國人)?

The "mixed identity" in the graph and table below refer to the combination of "Hongkonger but also Chinese" and "Chinese but also Hongkonger". "Others" refers to "Others / No answer / Refuse to answer" (其他 / 無答案 / 拒絕回答).

Graphical summary

Statistical table

References 

Opinion polling in Hong Kong